Mufti Mohammad Umer Naimi (Urdu محمد عمر نعیمی), was a scholar of hadith and Fiqh (Jurisprudence	Sunni Hanafi) of modern era from Up, India.

Birth and early life 
He was born in Moradabad UP India. He was the only living son of a middle class religious family, who had four daughters. Umer was admitted to jamia naeemia moradabad where he completed Dars E Nizami. He was awarded Dastare Fazeelat at annual convocation of the jamia attended by Ahmed Raza Khan Barelvi . He continued further studies of Tafseer, Fiqh, and hadith.

Career 
Naimi was offered key positions at madaris' of Calcutta, Nagpur and Mubarakpur but he preferred to stay under his teacher sadarul Afazil Maulana naeem uddin moradabadi. However he contributed fatawa in reply of quires. He was selected by Sadarul Afazil Maulana Naeem Uddin Moradabadi to assist in completing his tafseer Khazin ul Irfan.

Beside his regular duties he established a monthly magazine Sawad e azam to raise and create awareness of Islam. He was the editor and publisher of this magazine. Naimi opposed anti-Islamic movements like Shudhi and Sangthan led by Hindus. Umer worked for Pakistan movement, especially in 1945 elections, and actively participated in banaras sunni conference. After the creation of Pakistan, in 1950, he migrated to Pakistan with his family members and students. He then established an Islamic School named "Darul uloom Makhzan e Arabia" and worked as an honorary khatib in jamia masjid aram bagh for 15 years.

Pakistan movement
He supported the Pakistan Muslim league in 1945 elections and helped their candidates. During the Pakistan Movement, Umer was among the scholars who sided with Muhammad Ali Jinnah and the Muslim League, on the platform of the All India Sunni Conference held at Banaras in 1946. He was among organizers of the event and played a role in the creation of Pakistan.

Death
On 23 Zilqad 1386 AH, corresponding to 17 March 1966, at the age of 74 years, Umer died after a brief illness. His funeral was led by his son Mufti Athar Naimi. His mazar is adjacent to Darus salat Masjid located at block no 4 Nazimabad, Karachi.

Pakistan Movement activists
Pakistani Sunni Muslim scholars of Islam
20th-century Muslim scholars of Islam
Barelvis